Trần Thị Minh Tuyết (born 15 October 1976 in Ho Chi Minh City) better known as Minh Tuyết, is a Vietnamese-American pop singer, currently performing on Thúy Nga's Paris by Night. Her sisters are Cẩm Ly and Hà Phương who perform with her as part of the cast of Paris by Night. She is known in the Vietnamese American culture as the Vietnamese Pop Princess. Her real name is Trần Thị Minh Tuyết, which in English literally means "Morning Snow."

Early life

Born on 15 October 1976 in a family of four sisters and two brothers, Minh Tuyết had a passion for music early in her childhood. She started to perform in public when little. Her father is a music enthusiast who also wrote his own songs primarily as a hobby. Two of Minh Tuyết's elder sisters are singers Cẩm Ly and Hà Phương.

Minh Tuyết started her professional career at the age of 17 when she first appeared on the music stage at Trong Dong in Saigon. With a strong passion for singing, Minh Tuyết was determined to follow her sister Cẩm Ly's footsteps and pursue a career in singing. Initially, her parents had not approved her wishes fearing that she would not be able to handle a life in the public eye, but they later gave permission.

Minh Tuyết signed a music contract with Tinh Music and featured her first video with the company series number 3. Her first song, "Em Van Doi Anh", drew more attention with the Vietnamese audience. In many years with Tinh Music, Minh Tuyết released numerous hits from Lang Thang, Quán Vắng Một Mình, Bờ Bến Lạ, Mãi là người đến sau, etc. Despite her success, the company decided to release a solo video containing the only voice of Minh Tuyết with "Về Cuối Đường Tình" in DVD, VHS, and CD formats.

In mid-2002, Minh Tuyết was touring with host of Paris by Night Nguyễn Ngọc Ngạn in Australia when her voice captured his attention. He reached to the producers of Thúy Nga Productions and introduced her into the company. At the time, Minh Tuyết finished her long-term contract with Tinh Music and decided to sign with Thúy Nga. Her first performance with the company was in Paris, France for Paris by Night 65.

Only six years later, in 2008, Minh Tuyết was paired with male singer Bằng Kiều as a duet pair and partner. This immediately paid off when they released their first duet album, Bởi Vì Anh Yêu Em for Paris by Night 93, catching everyone's attention. At the time, Thúy Nga Productions did not have any idea that they would sing together at all. After that, they appeared and paired in many Paris by Night shows, concerts, and CDs/albums together, and many fans praised them as the "perfect duo".

Social media

Minh Tuyết's social media includes a Facebook page and a YouTube channel.

2018–present

Quê hương, tình yêu & tuỏ̂i trẻ. 17 - Tình Music MTV in Thailand
 Tinh Ta Thiet Tha - Johnny Dung, Minh Tuyet

Que Huong Tinh Yeu & Tuoi Tre 16 - Music Video, Live Show
 Que Toi - Minh Tuyết

Que Huong Tinh Yeu & Tuoi Tre 15 - Seoul, beautiful days
 Nguoi Ve Cuoi Pho - Minh Tuyết

Que Huong Tinh Yeu & Tuoi Tre 14 - Memories of Shanghai
 Dau Tinh Da Xa - Minh Tuyết

Que Huong Tinh Yeu & Tuoi Tre 13

MC: Orchid Lam Quynh, Kevin Khoa, Don Ho, Ha Vy, Huy Vu
 Lien Khuc Tophits 2 - Minh Tuyết, Hạ Vy, Vina Uyên Mỹ, Gia Linh, Tú Quyen, Thúy Vân, Huy Vũ, Gia Huy, Phillip Huy, Tuan Hưng, Kevin Khoa, Minh Chanh
 Sao Anh Ra Di - Minh Tuyết

Que Huong Tinh Yeu & Tuoi Tre 12

MC: Minh Nhi, Phi Nhung, Ha Vy, Tuong Nguyen

 Lien Khuc Cha Cha Cha - Minh Tuyet, Hạ Vy, Vina Uyen My, Rebecca Quynh Giao, Cat Ly, Huy Vu, Minh Chanh, Dan Phuong, Tien Dung, Tuan Hai
 Dau Co Muon Mang - Minh Tuyet
 Da Xa Cuoc Tinh - Minh Tuyet, Cam Ly

Que Huong Tinh Yeu & Tuoi Tre 11

MC: Nguyẽ̂n Dương

 Lien Khuc: Tophits - Minh Tuyết, Tâm Đoan, Hạ Vy, Diễm Liên, Thanh Truc, Rebecca Quynh Giao, Vina Uyên Mỹ, La Sương Sương, Huy Vũ, Tiên Dũng, Minh Chanh, Nhật Trung, Johnny Dũng
 Mai La Nguoi Den Sau - Minh Tuyết
 Lien Khuc: Dan Ca - Hạ Vy, Tâm Đoan, Minh Tuyết
 Huong Ruou Tinh Nong - Minh Tuyết, Huy Vũ

Que Huong Tinh Yeu & Tuoi Tre 10

MC: Nguyễn Dương

 Liên khúc: tình - Minh Tuyết, Hạ Vy, Tú Quyên, Diễm Liên, Thành Trực, Huy Vũ, Hoài Vũ, Duy Linh, Johnny Dũng
 Muộn màng - Minh Tuyết
 Mưa buò̂n - Minh Tuyết, Huy Vũ

Que Huong Tinh Yeu & Tuoi Tre 9

Bờ bé̂n lạ - Minh Tuyết
Né̂u phôi pha ngày mai - Minh Tuyết, Huy Vũ

Que Huong Tinh Yeu & Tuoi Tre 8
Kiep Ca Sau - Minh Tuyết, Huy Vũ
Ta Chang Con Ai - Minh Tuyết

Que Huong Tinh Yeu & Tuoi Tre 7

MC: Quynh Huong, Anh Dũng
Lang thang - Minh Tuyết
Em vè̂ tinh khôi - Minh Tuyết, Johnny Dũng

Que Huong Tinh Yeu & Tuoi Tre 6 - Happy Y2K

HAPPY Y2K - Hạ Vy, Minh Tuyết, Tú Quyên, Diễm Liên, Lưu Mỹ Linh, Johnny Dũng, Nhật Quân, Tuấn Thông
MẮT BUỒN - Minh Tuyết
ANH HÙNG XẠ ĐIỆU - Johnny Dũng, Minh Tuyết

Que Huong Tinh Yeu & Tuoi Tre 5

CÀ PHÊ MỘT MÌNH - Minh Tuyết
MỘT THỜI ĐÃ XA - Johnny Dũng, Minh Tuyết
Liên Khúc VÀO HẠ & SHA-LA-LA - Johnny Dũng, Huy Vũ, Hạ Vy, Minh Tuyết, Tú Quyên, Lưu Mỹ Linh

Que Huong Tinh Yeu & Tuoi Tre 4

TÌNH XUÂN - Hạ Vy, Minh Tuyết, Tú Quyên, Lưu Mỹ Linh, Johnny Dũng, Khánh Hoàng, Bảo Huy, Tuấn Thông
CHIỀU XUÂN - Minh Tuyết
TRÁI TIM KHÔNG NGỦ YÊN - Johnny Dũng, Minh Tuyết

Que Huong Tinh Yeu & Tuoi Tre 3
EM VẪN ĐỢI ANH - Minh Tuyết

Tinh Music Productions

Solo albums
Yeu Nhau Ghet Nhau (First solo studio album in US)
Cho Em Mot Ngay
Lang Thang
Va Em Con Mai Yeu Anh
Mat Buon
Tro Ve Pho Cu
Bo Ben La
Muon Mang, Goc Pho Buon
Mai La Nguoi Den Sau
Ve Cuoi Duong Tinh 
Sao Anh Ra Di?
The Best of Minh Tuyet from Tinh Music

Duets albums
Trai Tim Khong Ngu Yen (Duets with Johnny Dung)
Tinh Yeu Muon Thuo (Duets with Johnny Dung)
Tinh Don Phuong (Duets with Huy Vu)
Chan Tinh (Duets with Huy Vu)

Trio albums
Lien Khuc Tinh (with Tu Quyen & Johnny Dung)
The Best of Minh Tuyet Song Ca (with Johnny Dung & Huy Vu)
Tinh Chua Den, Tinh Da Voi Bay (with Huy Vu & Thuy Khanh)

DVD
Minh Tuyet MTV DVD 1: Ve Cuoi Duong Tinh

Thúy Nga Productions

Solo albums
Làm Sao Anh Biết (TNCD300), 2003
Ngày Xưa Anh Hỡi (TNCD325), 2004
Ðóa Hồng Ðẫm Máu (TNCD348), 2005
Yêu Một Người Sống Bên Một Người (TNCD402), 2007
Đã Không Còn Hối Tiếc (TNCD448), 2009
Yêu Không Nuối Tiếc (TNCD499), 2011
Một Đời Em Đã Yêu  (TNCD519), 2013
Anh Muốn Em Sống Sao (TNCD545), 2014

Duet albums
Bởi Vì Anh Yêu Em with Bằng Kiều (TNCD372), 2006
Một Lần Nữa Xin Có Nhau with Bằng Kiều (TNCD449), 2010
Xin Lỗi Anh - Best Of Duets (TNCD480), 2010
Lâu Đài Tình Ái with Bằng Kiều (TNCD537), 2014

DVDs
Mơ Những Ngày Nắng Lên - Video Nhạc & Karaoke (TNDVDKARAMT01), 2005
Đã Không Yêu Thì Thôi - The Best Of Minh Tuyết - Karaoke & Music Video (TNDVDKARMT), 2007
Yêu Một Người Sống Bên Một Người - Music Video & Karaoke - Volume 2 (TNDVDKARMT), 2008
Ca Nhạc Phim Truyện - Tôi Mơ! Tình Anh...Tình Em (TNDVDMT), 2010
Minh Tuyết Live Show - Kỷ Niệm 10 Năm Trình Diễn (MTDVD001), 2011
Anh Muốn Em Sống Sao - The Best of Minh Tuyết 3 - Karaoke (MTDVD3), 2015

References

External links
Miratunes bio
Singer Minh Tuyet dreams big in Little Saigon, Los Angeles Times, May 10, 2008
Minh Tuyết Bio 
Minh Tuyết thấy may mắn vì được yêu thương 
Chris Boulous (September 5, 2018) ‘I will be performing my fan favourites’ | Pop Princess looks forward to Moon Festival
Minh Tuyet Fans
Archived version of artist's English language site. The domain no longer belongs to the artist. 

1976 births
Living people
People from Ho Chi Minh City
American people of Vietnamese descent
Singers of Vietnamese descent